Lois Ranson (November 7, 1921 –  July 4, 2021) was an American film actress from 1939 to 1943 who appeared in Western films and serials. 

Ranson was born on November 7, 1921, in Los Angeles, California. 

She made 15 films, including Under Texas Skies (1940) in which she was the female lead alongside The Three Mesquiteers. She made five appearances in the Higgins Family series, playing the part of Betty Higgins.

Ranson was married to Charles Abbott Root, and they had a daughter.

Ranson died on July 4, 2021.

Filmography
 Winter Carnival (1939) as Patsy (uncredited)
 What a Life (1939) as student (uncredited)
 Money to Burn (1939) as Betty Higgins
 Grandpa Goes to Town (1940) as Betty Higgins

 The Crooked Road (1940) as street girl (uncredited)
 Grand Ole Opry (1940) as Susie Ann Weaver
 Earl of Puddlestone (1940) as Betty Higgins
 Under Texas Skies (1940) as Helen Smith
 Friendly Neighbors (1940) as Nancy Williams
 Meet the Missus (1940) as Betty Higgins
 Cheers for Miss Bishop (1941) as Gretchen Clark
 Petticoat Politics (1941) as Betty Higgins
 Angels with Broken Wings (1941) as Lois Wilson
 Pierre of the Plains (1942) as Clara
 The Renegade (1943) as Julie Martin

References

External links
 
 

1921 births
2021 deaths
20th-century American actresses
American film actresses
Film serial actresses
Western (genre) film actresses
Actresses from Los Angeles